Changying is the name of several places in the People's Republic of China:

 Changying, Beijing, a township in Chaoyang District
 Changying Station, a station on Line 6 of the Beijing Subway
 Changying, Henan, a township in Taikang county